Alen Markaryan, (born 30 June 1966, İstanbul) is a Turkish business entrepreneur, writer, sports columnist and activist. He is colloquially known of being a notable figure of Çarşı, supporters initiative of Beşiktaş J.K.

Life
Markaryan was born on 30 June 1966 in Istanbul. He is of Armenian descent. He can understand Armenian language, however he cannot speak it. He runs a kebap restaurant named "Aleni Kebap" located in Pangaltı, İstanbul.

Markaryan has regularly attended Beşiktaş games since he was 12 years old. He orchestrates pre-game choreographies of football games.

Markaryan worked at Turkish daily sports newspaper "Fotomaç" and Akşam as sports columnist.

Books

References

External links
Group Çarşı Official web page

1966 births
Journalists from Istanbul
Turkish people of Armenian descent
Living people
Businesspeople from Istanbul